Characters in the television series Gravity Falls:

Stanley Pines, more commonly known as Grunkle Stan in the series
Stanford Pines, his twin brother also known as Ford in the series